Zheng Dongguo was a field commander in the Republic of China National Revolutionary Army. He took part in the Second Sino-Japanese War, and was active in southern China and in the Burma theatre of the war, drawing troops from Yunnan. After the Japanese surrender in 1945, he was an important commander in the Chinese Civil War serving under Du Yuming and Chen Cheng in Manchuria.

Early life and career

Zheng was an outspoken critic of the Japanese presence in Manchuria and especially of the Japanese efforts to build up the state of Manchukuo.  He joined the Kuomintang and gained recognition from Generalissimo Chiang Kai-shek.  Zheng was also well liked by Chiang for his personal loyalty - Zheng was conservative with respect to Chinese cultural traditions of filial piety, which was recognized by other Neo-Confucians like Chiang.

Second Sino-Japanese War & World War II

Zheng made a name for himself as a capable commander, defeating forces of the technologically and logistically superior Imperial Japanese Army in several engagements in Yunnan, Burma, Northern China, and Manchuria.  In Yunnan, Zhang was considered popular with his troops, and many of the soldiers recruited and trained there would remain with him throughout the remainder of his campaigns with the Kuomintang. It is during this time that Zheng came under the command of General Du Yuming, and himself gained a degree of notoriety inside China.

Chinese Civil War

From 1945 to 1947 Zhang Dongguo served as a commander of Nationalist forces in Northeast China led by Lieutenant General Du Yuming participating in several significant victories against Communist forces there, including Du Yuming's defeat of the Communist general Lin Biao twice at Siping. After Chiang Kai-shek ordered Du Yuming's replacement by Chen Cheng, Zheng's and his troops were transferred under Chen's command.  Chen was not as capable as Du, and Communist forces led by Lin Biao quickly took control of the region in 1948, surrounding Zheng's troops garrisoned inside the city of Changchun.

Siege of Changchun

As part of the much greater Liaoshen Campaign, Communist forces led by Lin Biao, in the areas surrounding Changchun, cut off roads, railways, and other routes of entry and egress to the Northeast, and cordoned off the city of Changchun itself.  Though not surrounded by an ancient city wall, owing to the modernity of the city, the garrison had constructed, with the help of conscripted civilian labor a large moat, eight feet deep and twelve feet wide in 1947.  The defenders, veterans of many campaigns against communist and Japanese forces, were considered crack-troops.  Lin Biao deemed an assault on the city was deemed too costly and dangerous.  Instead, communist forces decided to conduct a siege of the city, while preparing ambushes and traps for any Nationalist relief columns, using the city as bait.

Chiang did not order Zheng to break out of Changchun, knowing that friendly lines were too far away. Chiang instead attempted to order other forces to relieve the city, but this was ineffective.  Chiang also attempted to keep the city supplied by air-drops, but the Nationalist air force was unable to fulfill this role due to its small size and lack of experience.  A small quantity of the supplies intended for the garrison actually landed inside communist lines, and the communist troops sometimes used these items for propaganda effect.

After destroying or thwarting several Nationalist relief columns, communist troops made overtures to the defenders, enticing them to surrender, but these were unsuccessful.  Mao Zedong decided that the city would fall once the defenders had been weakened sufficiently.  Famine was used by the communists during the siege in order to force the defending nationalist troops to capitulate; estimates range as high as 330,000.  Communist forces allowed Nationalist soldiers to leave, but prevented civilians from doing so, going so far as to force them back into the city at gun-point.  Many civilians starved to death at the city limits in front of communist forces as a result. The siege would last for 150 days, and resulted in the deaths from starvation of approximately 80 percent of the civilian population. When the 60th Army and New 7th Army surrendered, only 40,000 survivors remained by the time Zheng gave the order.

Later life

Zheng was captured after being forced to surrender Changchun. He spent several years as a prisoner of war, but was eventually released and lived out his remaining years in the People's Republic of China. In his later years, Zheng stated in several interviews that he regretted holding out for so long in Changchun, believing that it only caused further suffering and death.

See also
List of Battles of Chinese Civil War
National Revolutionary Army
History of the People's Liberation Army
Chinese Civil War
Republic of China
Second Sino-Japanese War
Siege of Changchun
White Snow, Red Blood

References

 
Zheng Jian Bang. Biography of Chinese Anti-Japanese General Zheng Dongguo. China: Guangxi Normal University Press. November 1, 2011 
White Snow, Red Blood
Tanne, Harold M. Where Chiang Kai-shek Lost China: The Liao-Shen Campaign, 1948. USA: Indiana University Press. August 10, 2015

Whampoa Military Academy alumni
People of the Northern Expedition
Chinese military personnel of World War II
National Revolutionary Army generals from Hunan
Chinese anti-communists
Recipients of the Order of Blue Sky and White Sun
Recipients of the Order of the Sacred Tripod
1903 births
1991 deaths
Republic of China people who surrendered to the Chinese Communist Party